Trollius chinensis, the Chinese globeflower, is a species of flowering plant in the family Ranunculaceae, found from southern Siberia to the southern Russian Far East, Sakhalin, the Kurils, Mongolia, Korea, and northern China (to north Henan). Its cultivar 'Golden Queen' has gained the Royal Horticultural Society's Award of Garden Merit.

References

chinensis
Garden plants of Asia
Flora of Amur Oblast
Flora of Inner Mongolia
Flora of Khabarovsk Krai
Flora of Korea
Flora of Manchuria
Flora of Mongolia
Flora of North-Central China
Flora of Primorsky Krai
Flora of Sakhalin
Flora of Siberia
Flora of Southeast China
Flora of the Kuril Islands
Taxa named by Alexander von Bunge
Plants described in 1835